Sune Susanna Deborah van Zyl (born 16 July 1977) is a South African former cricketer who played as an all-rounder. She appeared in 2 Test matches and 18 One Day Internationals for South Africa between 2002 and 2004. She played domestic cricket for Western Province, Boland and Lancashire.

References

External links
 
 

1977 births
Living people
South African women cricketers
South Africa women Test cricketers
South Africa women One Day International cricketers
White South African people
Sportspeople from Welkom
Western Province women cricketers
Boland women cricketers
Lancashire women cricketers